Tan Lei (1963–2016) was a mathematician specialising in complex dynamics and functions of complex numbers. She is most well-known for her contributions to the study of the Mandelbrot set and Julia set.

Career
After gaining her PhD in Mathematics in 1986 at University of Paris-Sud, Orsay, Tan worked as an assistant researcher in Geneva. She then conducted postdoctoral projects at the Max Planck Institute for Mathematics and University of Bremen until 1989, when she was made a lecturer at Ecole Normale Superieure de Lyon in France. Tan held a research position at University of Warwick from 1995 to 1999, before becoming a senior lecturer at Cergy-Pontoise University. She was made professor at University of Angers in 2009.

Mathematical work 
Tan obtained important results about the Julia and Mandelbrot sets, in particular investigating their fractality and the similarities between the two. For example she showed that at the Misiurewicz points these sets are asymptotically similar through scaling and rotation. She constructed examples of polynomials whose Julia sets are homeomorphic to the Sierpiński carpet and which are disconnected. She contributed to other areas of complex dynamics. She also wrote some surveys and popularisation work around her research topics.

Legacy
A conference in Tan's memory was held in Beijing, China, in May 2016.

Publications

Thesis

Books

Articles

References

1963 births
2016 deaths
Chinese women mathematicians
Chinese mathematicians
20th-century French mathematicians
French women mathematicians
Academic staff of the University of Angers
Academic staff of Paris-Sud University
Wuhan University alumni
Paris-Sud University alumni
People from Pingxiang
21st-century French mathematicians
Mathematicians from Jiangxi
Chinese emigrants to France
20th-century women mathematicians
21st-century women mathematicians
Chinese science writers
Writers from Jiangxi
20th-century French women
21st-century French women